June 28, 1914 is a novel by Bosnian writer Zlatko Topčić, published in 2019. The second edition was published in 2021 and won two awards; the Award of the Publishing Foundation for the best book (2021) and the 25 November Award for the book of the year (2022).

The novel deals with the Assassination of Archduke Franz Ferdinand in Sarajevo. It was presented at Bookstan, an international literary festival.

References

2019 novels
2021 novels
Bosnia and Herzegovina literature
Novels set in Bosnia and Herzegovina
Cultural depictions of Archduke Franz Ferdinand of Austria
Cultural depictions of Gavrilo Princip